Machairophora fulvipuncta, not to be confused with the Machairophora moths, is a species of beetle in the family Mordellidae, the only species in the genus Machairophora.

References

Mordellidae
Beetles described in 1893